Aechmea roeseliae is a species of flowering plant in the family Bromeliaceae. It is endemic to Ecuador.  Its natural habitat is subtropical or tropical moist montane forests. It is threatened by habitat loss.

References

Flora of Ecuador
roeseliae
Vulnerable plants
Plants described in 1998
Taxonomy articles created by Polbot